Nordbygda, Nordbygd, or Nordbygdi are place names in the Norwegian language.  The prefix "nord-" means "northern" and the root word "bygd(a/i)" refers to a "village" or "rural countryside".  The name may refer to the following places in Norway:

Places
Nordbygdi, Agder, a village in Bykle municipality in Agder county, Norway
Nordbygda, Buskerud, a village in Sigdal municipality in Viken county, Norway
Nordbygdi, Hjartdal, a village in Hjartdal municipality in Vestfold og Telemark county, Norway
Nordbygdi, Nissedal, a village in Nissedal municipality in Vestfold og Telemark county, Norway
Nordbygda, Oppland, a village in Nordre Land municipality in Innlandet county, Norway
Nordbygdi, Seljord, a village in Seljord municipality in Vestfold og Telemark county, Norway
Nordbygda, Vestland, a village in Samnanger municipality in Vestland county, Norway

See also
Austbygda (disambiguation)
Sørbygda (disambiguation)
Vestbygda (disambiguation)